Patrick Joseph "Pat" Hanlon (19 March 1930 – 30 October 2014) was an Australian politician. He was a Labor member of the Queensland Legislative Assembly from 1956 to 1974, representing the electorates of Ithaca (1956-1960) and Baroona (1960-1974).

Hanlon was born in the Brisbane suburb of Paddington, the son of future Premier Ned Hanlon and his wife Elizabeth (née Carver). He was educated at Marist Brothers College Rosalie, Marist College Ashgrove and the University of Queensland, where he graduated in commerce. After leaving university, he worked as a clerk accountant at the Olympic Tyre and Rubber Company from 1951 until his election to parliament in 1956, at the age of 26.

In July 1956, the Labor member for his father's old seat of Ithaca, Leonard Eastment, died in office, necessitating a by-election. Hanlon was selected as the new Labor candidate and won the seat. Having been elected the year before the 1957 Queensland Labor split, Hanlon was seen as being aligned with the party's industrial wing, rather than the more conservative Cabinet under Vince Gair.

Hanlon switched to the new seat of Baroona at the 1960 election following an electoral redistribution. In 1970, he became Shadow Treasurer under Jack Houston. He retired due to ill health at the 1974 election. Hanlon is sometimes called the "best Labor leader the ALP never had".

He died at Paddington in October 2014.

References

Members of the Queensland Legislative Assembly
1930 births
2014 deaths